The Southern Oregon Spartans were a junior ice hockey team that played their home games at The RRRink in Medford, Oregon.

History
On May 25, 2007, it was announced by the Northern Pacific Hockey League (NorPac) that two expansion teams would begin play during the 2007–08 season, the Missoula Maulers and the Rogue Valley Wranglers. When the Wranglers franchise was announced, the NorPac was a Tier III Junior B hockey league; however, on July 17, 2007, it was announced that the league and all its teams would be granted Tier III Junior A status. Also on July 17, the team announced the signing of their first player, Robert Reiber, who was later traded to the Eugene Generals.

After three seasons as the Wranglers, it was announced on February 20, 2010, that the team had been purchased by new ownership, led by Troy Irving and Forest Sexton, and would be re-established as the Southern Oregon Spartans. The new ownership confirmed that Steve Chelios would be hired on as the general manager and head coach of the team. The team played that evening for the first time as the Spartans and revealed the new team and logo to a crowd of over 900 fans from throughout Southern Oregon.

Starting in the 2012–13 season, the Spartans joined the AAU-sanctioned Western States Hockey League (WSHL) and played out of the Northwest Division. In 2019, the Spartans' management posted the franchise was for sale. The team was then sold to Dylan and Brie Martin in June 2019.

In 2020, the Spartans left the WSHL and joined another independent junior hockey league, the United States Premier Hockey League (USPHL), in the Premier Division. Due to local capacity restrictions on indoor events amidst the COVID-19 pandemic, the Spartans began their 2020–21 season playing in outdoor rinks with limited attendance. As restrictions increased, the team withdrew from the 2020–21 season after six games played on November 18, 2020. Working with the WSHL, their home arena, The RRRink, did not renew their lease with the Spartans in order to begin working with the WSHL again.

Season-by-season records

References

Sports in Medford, Oregon
Ice hockey teams in Oregon
Ice hockey clubs established in 2010
2010 establishments in Oregon